Tiroran is hamlet on the Isle of Mull in Argyll and Bute, Scotland.

History
In the late 18th century Tiroran House was associated with the McKinnon family. Several family members are documented to have lived in the area and then served in the war with America in 1775. In Victorian times, the Tiroran Estate was owned by Maude Cheape (known as the Squire of Bentley) but was sold several times over - in the late 20th century Sue and Robin Blockey purchased various estate properties and turned the main Tiroran House into an hotel, purchased in 1997 by Colin and Jane Tindal and then subsequently by Laurence and Katie Mackay (2004) Tiroran is home to the first distillery to be opened on the Isle of Mull (2017) in over 200 years and produces the islands first gin (Whitetail Gin) and other products from its copper still.  Historical archives and ancestry documents can be checked and searched through the local Museum called Pennyghae in the Past which is located within Tiroran.

Geography
The hamlet of Tiroran lies on the South West side of the Isle of Mull on the northern shores of Loch Scridain, just off the B8035 road. The immediate surrounding area is dominated by the fertile Victorian woodland gardens and forests of Tiroran House as well as the large community owned Tiroran Forest, There is a river, or burn known as Alt Orian which runs through Tiroran and down to an original Victorian trout pond and waterfall within the Tiroran Estate grounds. Salmon are caught on the river and permits are available from the Pennyghael Post Office. To the northeast is Ben More.

Tiroran House
Tiroran House, A multi award-winning country house estate with several holiday properties, lies within  of gardens and grounds and is also home to Whitetail Gin. The main house, formerly a Victorian hunting lodge owned by the Squire of Bentley (Maude Cheape) is set in manicured gardens, with woodland and glen walks that lead down to the private shores of Loch Scridain - Tiroran is now a small, exclusive estate and has been in the Mackay/Munro family since 2004. From this small estate the family run various business interests including accommodation and a distillery. distillery.

References

Villages on the Isle of Mull
Country houses in Argyll and Bute
Hotels in Argyll and Bute